Kevin Louie Platon Alas (born November 13, 1991) is a Filipino professional basketball player for the NLEX Road Warriors of the Philippine Basketball Association (PBA). He was drafted second overall by the Rain or Shine Elasto Painters in the 2014 PBA draft.

Early life and amateur career

Alas attended Grade School at Blessed Trinity School in Las Piñas and began playing organized basketball when he was in the 5th grade. The following year, he transferred to Letran where he would soon engage in more competitive tournaments. He would eventually make the Letran Squires lineup during his 2nd year in high school. Along with his brother, Junjun, and Mythical Five member John Noble, Kevin helped lead the Squires to the NCAA Juniors Finals in 2007 where they got swept in two games by a powerhouse San Sebastian Staglets team that featured Ryan Buenafe and Arvie Bringas. The following season, his last with the Squires, Letran made it back to the finals setting up a rematch with San Sebastian. But, once again, the Staglets dominated the Squires, sweeping them again to complete a historic four-peat and a perfect 14–0 record in the NCAA juniors division. But, despite two heartbreaking defeats, Kevin did not fail to impress talent scouts as a number of schools were interested in acquiring his services for the college game. Ironically, Alas trained with an old Letran rival, De La Salle University where he practiced for nearly two months before making his decision on which school to play for in college. Without any advice or influence from anybody, including his father, who gave him the free hand to select a school, Kevin personally decided that it would be best for him to stay with Letran.

He played his collegiate career with the Letran Knights and won two Mythical 5 selections in Seasons 87 and 88 then after losing to the San Beda Red Lions in the 2012 finals series, he elected to forgo his final playing year to join Gilas Pilipinas. During his time with Gilas, he was a key part of the team's gold medal finish in the 2013 SEA Games and a bronze medal finish in the 2014 FIBA Asia Cup.

He also played for the NLEX Road Warriors in the PBA D-League and led the team to several championships.  By the time his D-League stint is over, he then decided to apply for 2014 PBA draft along with his elder brother, Junjun.

Professional career

Alas was drafted 2nd overall by the Rain or Shine Elasto Painters during the 2014 PBA draft, and signed a three-year deal with the team. He was groomed to take over the starting point guard spot since at that time when he was drafted, starting point guard Paul Lee requested to be traded to another team. However, when Lee decided to stay with Rain or Shine, Alas became expendable, thus they decided to trade him to NLEX for a 2015 first round pick. He was traded once again, this time to NLEX's sister team Talk 'N Text Tropang Texters, in a deal that sent Niño Canaleta to the Road Warriors, with Blackwater Elite as conduit which acquired Larry Rodriguez and 2015 1st round draft pick of Talk 'N Text Tropang Texters.

On August 25, 2015, Alas, along with forward Rob Reyes, was traded by Talk 'N Text to Mahindra Enforcer in exchange for Troy Rosario. He was then quickly traded back to Talk 'N Text's sister team NLEX Road Warriors in exchange for forwards Niño Canaleta and Aldrech Ramos.

In November 2017, Alas was named as part of the Gilas Pilipinas line-up that will compete at the 2019 FIBA World Cup qualifiers against Japan and Chinese Taipei. In February 2018, he was again included to compete against Australia and on their second meeting against Japan.

PBA career statistics

As of the end of 2022–23 season

Season-by-season averages
 
|-
| align=left | 
| align=left | Talk 'N Text
| 40 || 18.7 || .398 || .287 || .644 || 1.9 || 1.8 || .3 || .2 || 6.5
|-
| align=left | 
| align=left | NLEX
| 35 ||	26.2 || .391 || .292 || .685 || 2.8 || 1.7 || .5 || .1 || 7.4
|-
| align=left | 
| align=left | NLEX
| 34 ||	26.1 || .443 || .253 || .579 || 3.9 || 2.6 || .7 || .2 || 11.6
|-
| align=left | 
| align=left | NLEX
| 18 ||	24.7 || .428 || .286 || .784 || 5.1 || 2.7 || .8 || .2 || 11.1
|-
| align=left | 
| align=left | NLEX
| 9 || 17.6 || .293 || .333 || .636 || 2.2 || 2.6 || .6 || .0 || 5.2
|-
| align=left | 
| align=left | NLEX
| 10 || 27.3 || .444 || .318 || .818 || 6.3 || 4.2 || .7 || .1 || 16.2
|-
| align=left | 
| align=left | NLEX
| 30 || 30.6 || .401 || .221 || .756 || 4.4 || 4.4 || 1.1 || .3 || 14.2
|-
| align=left | 
| align=left | NLEX
| 35 || 30.1 || .482 || .371 || .703 || 4.8 || 4.1 || .9 || .1 || 16.7
|-class=sortbottom
| align=center colspan=2 | Career
| 211 || 25.6 || .425 || .292 || .698 || 3.7 || 2.9 || .7 || .2 || 11.0

Personal life

He is the second of four siblings. His father is his former coach in college, former Letran coach and former Phoenix Pulse Fuel Masters head coach Louie Alas. He is also the younger brother of fellow 2014 draft classmate Junjun Alas as well as cousin to historian Pepe Alas.

He is married to courtside reporter Selina Dagdag.

References

1991 births
Living people
Basketball players from Metro Manila
Filipino men's basketball players
Letran Knights basketball players
NLEX Road Warriors players
Point guards
People from Las Piñas
Philippine Basketball Association All-Stars
Philippines men's national basketball team players
Rain or Shine Elasto Painters draft picks
Southeast Asian Games competitors for the Philippines
Southeast Asian Games gold medalists for the Philippines
Southeast Asian Games medalists in basketball
Competitors at the 2013 Southeast Asian Games
TNT Tropang Giga players